The Cobh Wanderers F.C. is a football club based in Ireland, which existed from 1925 until the 1940s, and again from 1981 to the present day.

Original Cobh Wanderers Football Club

The original Cobh Wanderers, which were founded in 1925, were to leave their mark at local and national levels although they had a relatively brief existence.
There was a very popular district league in Cobh in the 1920s with such teams as Red Rovers, Blue Rovers, Sunny Havanas, Pride of the East and Springfield taking part. Jack Hurley was very much involved with the running of the league. Jack and his brother Pakie Hurley, both ex-service P.E. Instructors, brought together some of the better players to form a new club, Cobh Wanderers. There were many tough encounters between the young Wanderers and teams made up of many servicemen living locally at the time. These games taught them at an early age how to take care of themselves as they were playing against physically stronger men. Pakie Hurley's influence and experience were very important to this young side. There were some well known names in that Wanderers side such as Henry Ward, Mick Doherty and Tom Burke, who went on to gain international honours. The team started at minor level and had an impressive win in the final of the Cork Minor Cup in 1925/26 beating Sutton 7–0 at Victoria Cross, Cork. A Junior side was started and the club even played Senior for a couple of seasons before its final demise.

In their brief history Wanderers played on various pitches. The main one was Villa Park (where Moore's Place is now). They also played in Carrignafoy and Ticknock (adjacent to where the slaughterhouses were located). They had no clubhouse as such until eventually they were allowed to use McGowan's shed, which was behind where the Spar shop is today. The shed was used for meetings and dances (or "Hops" as they were known) were also held there.

In the late 1920s players of the quality of Mossy Cummins, Jim Agger, John 'Speed' Hennessy, Joe O'Driscoll and Jackie O’Reilly were regular Wanderers players. The club was soon to embark on its most successful spell. They were runner-up in both the Minor League and Cup in 1930/31. The following season they bettered this by winning the League and Cup, remaining unbeaten in both competitions. Among the stars of that 1930/31 side were Dick O'Keeffe, Dick Barry, Jim Cotter, Joe Murphy and John Hennessy.
The team late moved up to Junior level and 1933/1934 had the distinction of reaching the final of the "Free State" Junior Cup. They lost 2–1 to B & I in Dalymount Park despite a great goal from Jerry Walker and outstanding displays from Jim Cotter, Joe Murphy and John Hennessy.

The Wanderers were runner-up in the Junior 2nd Division League in 1934/35. Further success was achieved in 1935/36 when they beat North End 2–1 in the Cork Area Final of the Munster Junior Cup in Villa Park.

Some names to note from the 1930s teams were the famous 'Pop' Keller, Paddy O'Neill, Paddy O'Rourke, Dave Stack and Ted 'Tildy' Lawton. There are some interesting connections between players of that era and the  more recent Wanderers teams. Paddy O'Neill was Paul O'Neill's father, Jim 'Tubby' Cotter was grand-uncle of Eoin O'Sullivan (both of them earning International caps). Paddy O'Rourke was also a dedicated Wanderer. Dave Stack, ex Cobh Ramblers President, played Minor, Junior and Senior for the Club and the uncle of Joe and Tim Stack. Timmy Burns (Sr) was also involved with the Club and his grandson Ger and Timmy also played for the current club.

In the 1930s the Wanderers had the honour of having two of their players capped for their country. Dick Barry was capped at Junior level versus Scotland in 1933/34 and later won a second cap versus England in Dublin. He went on to play for Ramblers in the Intermediate Cup Finals of 1939/40 and 1941/42. Jim 'Tubby' Cotter who was a stylish full back, was capped in 1934/35 also at Junior level versus Scotland. He joined League of Ireland side Limerick in 1937 and played for Cork F.C. and also Ramblers in an along and distinguished career.

The Wanderers did not survive beyond the 1940s. This was a time of high level unemployment and when work became available in London there was a big exodus from Cobh which including most of the players. As well as this more members joined the services during the war and eventually the club folded. Cobh Wanderers may not have existed for very long but they had the success in their era, and they are well remembered. It is only fitting that the present day club should take its name from such a famous predecessor.

Current Cobh Wanderers F.C.

When Cobh Wanderers was founded in 1981 one of the main aims of the club was to one day purchase their own ground. Initially home games were played in Whitegate. Since then the club has been lucky enough to have had the use of the excellent facilities at the Cobh Community College. Without these facilities it would not have been possible to have continued as a club.

In 1993 the club became aware that some land was available for purchase in the Ticknock area. Meetings took place with the landowner and with the local bank, AIB. A business plan was drawn up and an agreement was reached to purchase approximately five acres in Ticknock.

The club officially took possession of the property in May 1995. It was decided to develop the land in phases as and when finances allowed. Then in 1996 an application was made for National Lottery funding. After receiving a further bank loan work commenced on the development in May 1997.

In July 2016, they appointed former Carrigtwohill United manager, Michael Deasy as manager of the senior side. The appointment has proved to be very successful. Under Deasy's tenure, Cobh have won two trophies, the Donnie Forde Cup and Keane Cup. They have also been runner's up in three major competitions, the Beamish Cup, Munster Senior League and the FAI Intermediate Cup.

In May 2017, Cobh Wanderers were defeated by Liffey Wanderers in the FAI Intermediate Cup Final, on penalties. It was first time they had reached the final in the club's history.

In November 2017, Cobh Wanderers won the Keane Cup by defeating Castleview AFC 3-0. It was the first time they won the trophy in the club's history.

Current squad

References

External links

1925 establishments in Ireland
Association football clubs in County Cork
Cobh
Munster Senior League (association football) clubs
Association football clubs established in 1925
Association football clubs established in 1981
1940s disestablishments in Ireland
1981 establishments in Ireland